Ernest Lamour 'Wheels' Wheelwright (November 28, 1939 – May 1, 2001) was an American football player.  He attended Southern Illinois University.

He had several careers but is chiefly remembered as an American football player who played as a running back for the New York Giants (1964–65), Atlanta Falcons (1966–67)  and the New Orleans Saints (1967–70).

He was also an actor who appeared in a number of films including: The Longest Yard (1974), Trackdown (1976), The Greatest (1977) & Wildcats (1986). Immediately before he began his career as a running back he had served in the 101st Airborne Division(a.k.a. the Screaming Eagles).

Ernie Wheelwright was also owner of one of Atlanta's premier nightclubs in the 1960s, the Pink Pussycat Club.  'Wheels' hosted many visiting black artists and had the opportunity to cut a record 'Beggin You Back' for the local Gaye label owned by Johnny Brooks. In 1970 the NFL asked Wheelwright, then with the New Orleans Saints, to sell his interest on the grounds that continuing ownership would bring the NFL into disrepute.

Ernie Wheelwright died of cancer in Las Vegas on  May 1, 2001, aged 61.

Filmography

Notes

References

External links 
 

1939 births
2001 deaths
Players of American football from Columbus, Ohio
American football running backs
Southern Illinois Salukis football players
New York Giants players
Atlanta Falcons players
New Orleans Saints players
African-American male actors
American male film actors
American male television actors
20th-century American male actors
Deaths from cancer in Nevada
20th-century African-American male singers